Dragomer is a settlement southwest of Ljubljana in the Municipality of Log-Dragomer in the Inner Carniola region of Slovenia.

Name
Dragomer was attested in written sources in 1444 as Dragamer. It is based on a Slavic personal name, *Dragomirъ or *Dragoměrъ, presumably referring to an early inhabitant of the place.

Church

The local church in the settlement is dedicated to Saint Lawrence and belongs to the Parish of Brezovica.

References

External links 
Dragomer on Geopedia

Populated places in the Municipality of Log-Dragomer